Castromudarra is a locality located in the municipality of Almanza, in León province, Castile and León, Spain. As of 2020, it has a population of 33.

Geography 
Castromudarra is located 58km east of León, Spain.

References

Populated places in the Province of León